The Josef-Hofmiller-Gymnasium (JoHo) is a gymnasium in Freising, Bavaria, Germany. It is named after Josef Hofmiller (DE).

Currently, around 820 students are taught in 24 classes at the Josef-Hofmiller-Gymnasium.

References

External links

  Josef-Hofmiller-Gymnasium

Freising (district)
Schools in Bavaria
Gymnasiums in Germany
Buildings and structures in Freising (district)